David Croitoru (born 9 August 2003) is a Romanian professional footballer who plays as a midfielder for Liga I club FC Argeș Pitești.

Club career

Botoșani
He made his debut in professional football for Botoșani under the guidance of his father, Marius Croitoru.

Career statistics

Club

References

2003 births
Living people
Sportspeople from Bacău
Romanian footballers
Association football midfielders
Liga I players
FC Botoșani players
FC U Craiova 1948 players
FC Argeș Pitești players